The 2021 Notre Dame Fighting Irish men's soccer team represented the University of Notre Dame during the 2021 NCAA Division I men's soccer season. It was the program's 44th season. It was the program's ninth season competing in the Atlantic Coast Conference.  The Fighting Irish were led by head coach Chad Riley, in his fourth year and played their home games at Alumni Stadium in Notre Dame, Indiana.

The Fighting Irish finished the season 14–5–5 overall and 4–2–2 in ACC play to finish in third place in the Coastal Division.  As the fifth overall seed in the ACC Tournament they defeated NC State in the First Round, Louisville on penalties in the Second Round, Pittsburgh in the Semifinals, and Duke in the Final to win the tournament.  This was their first tournament title after moving to the ACC in 2013.  As tournament champions, they received an automatic bid to the NCAA Tournament and were awarded the fourth overall seed.  After a First Round bye, they defeated Villanova in the Second Round, Wake Forest in the Third Round, and Pittsburgh in the Quarterfianls via penalty shootout before losing to Clemson in the Semifinals again via penalty shootout to end their season.

Background

The teams' 2020 season was significantly impacted by the COVID-19 pandemic, which curtailed the fall season and caused the NCAA Tournament to be played in Spring 2021. The ACC was one of the only two conferences in men's soccer to play in the fall of 2020.  The ACC also held a mini-season during the spring of 2021.

The Fighting Irish finished the fall season 5–4–0 and 3–2–0 in ACC play to finish in third place in the North Division.  In the ACC Tournament they defeated North Carolina in the Quarterfinals before losing to Pittsburgh in the Semifinals.  They finished the spring season 3–5–0 and 1–5–0 in ACC play, to finish in sixth place in the Coastal Division.  They were not invited to the NCAA Tournament.

In the 2021 MLS SuperDraft, the Fighting Irish had one player drafted: Aiden McFadden.

Player movement

Players leaving

Players arriving

Squad

Roster

Team management

Source:

Schedule
Source:

|-
!colspan=6 style=""| Exhibition

|-
!colspan=6 style=""| Regular Season

|-
!colspan=6 style=";"| ACC Tournament

|-
!colspan=6 style=";"| NCAA Tournament

Awards and honors

2022 MLS Super Draft

Source:

Rankings

References

2021
Notre Dame Fighting Irish
Notre Dame Fighting Irish
Notre Dame Fighting Irish men's soccer
Notre Dame
NCAA Division I Men's Soccer Tournament College Cup seasons